Hyoksin Station is a station on Hyŏksin Line of the Pyongyang Metro, North Korea.

The station is across the street from a park and surrounded by residential and mixed use buildings.

References

External links
 

Pyongyang Metro stations
Railway stations opened in 1975
1975 establishments in North Korea